Periodistas is a Spanish drama television series set in the editorial office of a newspaper. Produced by Globomedia and starring, among others, José Coronado, Amparo Larrañaga, Álex Angulo, Alicia Borrachero, Esther Arroyo and Belén Rueda, its 9 seasons originally aired from 1998 to 2002 on Telecinco. Its success in Spain generalised a wave of series set in professional environments.

Premise 
The series revolves around the Crónica Universal, a fictional newspaper from Madrid, accounting for both the journalists' ups and downs of street work as well as their personal inter-relationships in the day-to-day at the editorial office. The fiction kicks off with Luis Sanz (José Coronado) joining the newspaper as head of the Local section, covering the post left vacant by Laura Maseras (Amparo Larrañaga), who has been promoted to the post of deputy editor of the newspaper.

Cast

Production and release 
The Bar "La Tertulia" in which the characters often met after work is actually located on the corner of Calle Barquillo and Fernando VI, in Madrid.

The broadcasting run, consisting of 9 seasons and 119 episodes, ended on 8 July 2002. The series enjoyed success in terms of audience, attracting more than 4.5 million viewers per episode on a regular basis as well as consistently breaking the 25% share mark.

References 

1998 Spanish television series debuts
2002 Spanish television series endings
1990s Spanish drama television series
2000s Spanish drama television series
Television shows set in Madrid
Television series about journalism
Television shows filmed in Spain
Telecinco network series
1990s workplace drama television series
2000s workplace drama television series
Television series by Globomedia